Upper Changi MRT station is an underground Mass Rapid Transit station on the Downtown Line in Tampines planning area, Singapore, located under Upper Changi Road East.

The station serves residential estates in the vicinity and the campus of the Singapore University of Technology and Design, which is linked via an underground linkway. The station, along with Fort Canning, is one of the longest stations along the line, at 205 meters.

History

Construction of the station started in October 2011. During the construction, a Shell petrol station was acquired and demolished, and the road Upper Changi Road East have to be realigned for the construction. Its working name was Somapah, named after Somapah Road, which is nearby.

Contract 923 for the design and construction of Upper Changi Station and  crossover tunnels from Upper Changi to Expo stations was awarded to Samsung C&T Corporation at a sum of S$256.98 million in August 2011. Another contract, Contract 923A for the design and construction of tunnels between Tampines East and Upper Changi stations, was awarded to Shanghai Tunnel Engineering Co. Ltd at a contract value of S$91.13 million.

On 24 April 2014, there was a depression of a section of Upper Changi Road East, causing a tipper truck to sink in. The driver was not injured and there was no other injuries. Traffic had been diverted, with two lanes closed, while the Land Transport Authority (LTA) carried out reinstatement works.

The station opened on 21 October 2017 along with other Downtown Line Stage Three stations, as announced by the Land Transport Authority on 31 May that year.

References

External links

Railway stations in Singapore opened in 2017
Changi
Mass Rapid Transit (Singapore) stations